The Space Gamer was a magazine dedicated to the subject of science fiction and fantasy board games and tabletop role-playing games. It quickly grew in importance and was an important and influential magazine in its subject matter from the late 1970s through the mid-1980s. The magazine is no longer published, but the rights holders maintain a web presence using its final title Space Gamer/Fantasy Gamer.

History
The Space Gamer (TSG) started out as a digest quarterly publication of the brand new Metagaming Concepts company in March 1975. Howard M. Thompson, the owner of Metagaming and the first editor of the magazine, stated "The magazine had been planned for after our third or fourth game but circumstances demand we do it now" (after their first game, Stellar Conquest). Initial issues were in a plain-paper digest format. By issue 17, it had grown to a full size bimonthly magazine, printed on slick paper.

When Steve Jackson departed Metagaming to found his own company, he also secured the right to publish The Space Gamer from number 27 on. In the first Steve Jackson Games (SJG) issue, Howard Thompson wrote a report on Metagaming and stated "Metagaming's staff won't miss the effort. After the change in ownership, Metagaming feels comfortable with the decision; it was the right thing to do." In the same issue, Steve Jackson announced, "TSG is going monthly... from [number 28 (May 1980)] on, it'll be a monthly magazine." The magazine stayed with SJG for the next five years, during which it was at its most popular and influential. In 1983, the magazine was split into two separate bimonthly magazines published in alternating months: Space Gamer (losing the definite article with the split in Number 64), and Fantasy Gamer; the former concentrating entirely on science fiction, and the latter on fantasy. This arrangement lasted about a year. Fantasy Gamer ran six issues before being folded back into Space Gamer:

You see, we were churning out magazines - Space Gamer, Fantasy Gamer, Fire & Movement, and Autoduel Quarterly - at the rate of two a month!...

We had to find some way to preserve what little sanity we had left. The best way to do this was to merge Space Gamer and Fantasy Gamer... As it has for the past year, Space Gamer will appear bimonthly, giving us the time to get some games done, as well.

Like Metagaming before it, the effort of producing a magazine became greater than its publisher was willing to bear. The change to bi-monthly publication was not enough to allow SJG to focus on new games as they wished, and in 1985, it was announced, "We've sold Space Gamer. We'll still be heavily involved—but SJ Games won't be the publisher any longer. Giving up SG is definitely traumatic... but it gives us the time to do other things, especially GURPS". The magazine had been sold to Diverse Talents, Incorporated (DTI). They initially had it as a section in their own magazine The VIP of Gaming, but it soon became a separate publication again with the previous numbering and format, but with the name Space Gamer/Fantasy Gamer. Space Gamer ceased publication in September 1985.

Since that time, it has gone through a number of owners, all keeping the final name, but occasionally restarting the numbering. Eventually, Better Games, now renamed Space Gamer, bought the magazine, and has kept the title alive by reinventing it through the internet.

In 2010 Steve Jackson Games started republishing back issues in PDF format.

Editors
Metagaming
 C. Ben Ostrander: #9 (Dec./Jan. 1976) – #26 (Jan./Feb. 1980)
 Howard Thompson: #1 (copyright 1975) – #5 (Mar./May 1976)
Steve Jackson Games
 Aaron Allston: #52 (June 1982) – #65 (Sept/Oct 1983)
 Also Fantasy Gamer: #1 (Aug./Sep. 1983) and co-edited Number #2 (Dec./Jan. 1984)
 Christopher Frink: #66 (Nov./Dec. 1983) – #69 (May/June 1984)
 Also Fantasy Gamer: co-edited #2 (Dec./Jan. 1984) and edited #3 (Feb./Mar. 1984) – #6 (June/July 1984)
 Forrest Johnson: #28 (May/June 1980) – #51 (May 1982)
 Steve Jackson: #27 (Mar./Apr. 1980)
Warren Spector: #70 (July/Aug. 1984) – #76 (Sept/Oct 1985)
Diverse Talents Incorporated
 Anne Jaffe: #77 (Jan./Feb. 1987) – #82 (July/Aug. 1988)
3W Inc.
 Barry Osser & Jay Adan: Vol.II, No.1 (#86, July/Aug. 1989) – Vol.II, No.2 (#87, Oct./Nov. 1989)
 Jeff Albanese & Perrin D. Tong: #83 (Oct./Nov. 1988) – #85 (Jan./Feb. 1989)
Future Combat Simulations
 Jeff Albanese & Perrin D. Tong: #88 (Mar./Apr. 1990) {The majority of the articles printed in issue #88 were from works originally edited by Barry Osser prior to the demise of 3W Inc. and were not credited to him.}
Better Games
 Pat Mannion: #1 (Sep./Oct. 1992) – #3 (Jan./Feb. 1993)
 Red Dog: #4 (Mar./Apr. 1993) – #8 (©1994, states "93rd Issue of Publication" but was actually the 96th overall)

Reviews
Dragon #195 (July 1993)
The Strategic Review #6

Awards
The Space Gamer won the 1977 Charles S. Roberts Award for Best Semiprofessional Magazine. The Space Gamer was awarded the Origins Award for "Best Professional Roleplaying Magazine of 1982".

References

External links
 Archived Space Gamer Magazines on the Internet Archive

Bimonthly magazines published in the United States
Defunct science fiction magazines published in the United States
Game magazines
Hobby magazines published in the United States
Magazines disestablished in 1985
Magazines established in 1975
Origins Award winners
Quarterly magazines published in the United States
Role-playing game magazines